Mangifera dongnaiensis is a species of plant in the family Anacardiaceae. It is an endangered endemic tree found in Vietnam, where it is called xoài rừng.

References

dongnaiensis
Endemic flora of Vietnam
Trees of Vietnam
Endangered plants
Taxonomy articles created by Polbot
Plants described in 1897